Besiyata Dishmaya is an Aramaic phrase, meaning 'with the help of Heaven'. The acronym  has become a popular term among Orthodox Jews, reproduced at the top of every written document (beginnings of correspondences, letters, notes, etc.) as a reminder to them that all comes from God, including the following content, and to contextualize what is really important in the text—without God's help, nothing can be done successfully. This practice is not derived from any religious law of halakha, but it is considered an old accepted tradition.

Abbreviation 
The reason for the common use of the three-letter abbreviation, is probably because it does not contain the letter Hei, that is used to imply the name of God, and for this reason, a page which contains these letters, without any other Torah content, does not require genizah (a process for writings that contain the name of God), and thus can be thrown away without fear of violation.

Other languages, according to Judaism, are not considered the same as the sacred language (lashon Hakodesh), and therefore have no such restriction.

B'ezrat HaShem 
B'ezrat HaShem is a similar phrase.

The book Toldot Yitzhak (The Offspring of Isaac), by Yitzhak Karo, offers the meaning of this custom of writing  (B"H), at the top of every letter, with accordance to the biblical verse: "In all thy ways acknowledge Him, and He will direct thy paths" (Book of Proverbs 3:6).

Cultural influence 
 In the Israeli Declaration of Independence, Yehuda Leib Maimon added the abbreviation  (B'ezrat HaShem, "with God's help") before his name, so that God's name would appear in the document.
 In his book Mac OS X and iOS Internals: To the Apple's Core, Jonathan Levin named his BSD related chapter (Chapter 13): "BS”D – The BSD Layer" as allusions to his Jewish roots and to Mac OS X needing the help of a greater power (its BSD core) to get to where it did.
 Tofutti products feature the Hebrew expression on the side of all their packaging.
 MoroccanOil products feature the Hebrew expression on all of their products.

See also 
 Ad maiorem Dei gloriam
 Basmala
 Deus vult
 Inshallah

References

External links 

 B"H Chabad glossary
 bs"d Jerusalem Life glossary

Aramaic words and phrases
Aramaic words and phrases in Jewish prayers and blessings
Religious formulas